Alfred N. Poyneer (July 29, 1831 – August 28, 1897) was an American politician and farmer.

Born in Connecticut, Poyneer settled in Montour, Iowa and owned a farm. He served in the Iowa State Senate and later served as Lieutenant Governor of Iowa. He died in Montour, Iowa.

References

1831 births
1897 deaths
People from Tama County, Iowa
Iowa state senators
Lieutenant Governors of Iowa
19th-century American politicians